Haljulia is an extinct genus of prehistoric bony fish that lived during the upper Cenomanian.
This fish may have used gills or lungs, but its use of their skeleton is inconclusive.

See also

 Prehistoric fish
 List of prehistoric bony fish

References

Late Cretaceous fish
Prehistoric bony fish genera